Robert Agranoff (May 25, 1936 – November 14, 2019) was an American political scientist and public administration scholar and author. A Professor Emeritus at the Indiana University School of Public and Environmental Affairs, Agranoff was best known for his contributions to the field of collaborative public management and intergovernmental management.

Academic career 
Robert Agranoff graduated as a Bachelor of Science in political science and economics from the University of Wisconsin–River Falls at River Falls in 1962. At the University of Pittsburgh, he received a Master of Arts (1963) and Ph.D. (1967) in political science. Between 1966 and 1980, Agranoff worked as a professor at Northern Illinois University and became an expert in the process of human services program integration.

In 1980, Agranoff joined the School of Public and Environmental Affairs (SPEA) at Indiana University. During his tenure at SPEA, Agranoff focused on the issue of intergovernmental collaboration including the dynamics of federalism and the characterization of public organizational networks. After acquiring Emeritus status in 2001, Agranoff maintained its activity in research, authoring and teaching.

Books 
Robert Agranoff is the author of the following books:

 The Management of Election Campaigns, 1976
 Dimensions of Services Integration: Service Delivery, Program Linkages, Policy Management, Organizational Structure, 1979 (Co-authored with Alex Pattakos)
 Intergovernmental Management: Human Services Problem Solving in Six Metropolitan Areas, 1986
 New Governance for Rural America: Creating Intergovernmental Partnerships, 1996 (Co-author)
 Collaborative Public Management: New Strategies for Local Governments, 2003
 Federalismo y Autonomía, 2004 (Co-authored with Enric Argullol, In Spanish)
 Managing Within Networks: Adding Value to Public Organizations, 2007
 Local Governments and their Intergovernmental Networks in Federalizing Spain, 2010 (Co-authored with Enric Argullol, In Spanish)

Awards 
 Louis Brownlow Book Award by the National Academy of Public Administration, 2003
 Fellow of the National Academy of Public Administration, 2011 
 Martha Derthick Book Award by the American Political Science Association, 2014

References 

1936 births
American political scientists
University of Wisconsin–River Falls alumni
University of Pittsburgh alumni
Northern Illinois University faculty
Indiana University faculty
2019 deaths